"Whipski" is a single by American rapper Snot featuring fellow American rapper Lil Skies and American record label/production collective Internet Money. Produced by IM members Taz Taylor, Nash Beats, and Cxdy, it was released on April 8, 2021 with an accompanying music video.

Background
Prior to its release, the song was teased for a while. It gained higher anticipation when it was revealed that Cole Bennett would be directing the visual.

Composition
The song finds Snot rapping about driving in a car and partying with a girl over a guitar instrumental.

Music video
The music video was released on April 8, 2021, through Bennett's Lyrical Lemonade channel. It depicts Snot and Lil Skies as employees at an automobile repair shop. They catch their boss sleeping, attack him and take a van for a joyride. The van breaks down, but Snot solves the problem by turning it into a vintage BMW with a magic wrench. However, the boss appears and burns down the car with a flamethrower, and is hit by a passing vehicle. A pair of purple alien girls show up and give the rappers a ride, with something in store for them.

Charts

References

2021 singles
2021 songs
Snot (rapper) songs
Lil Skies songs
Internet Money songs
300 Entertainment singles
Songs about cars
Song recordings produced by Taz Taylor (record producer)
Songs written by Taz Taylor (record producer) 
Songs written by Lil Skies